As of September 2016, the International Union for Conservation of Nature (IUCN) lists 81 extinct species, 86 possibly extinct species, and two extinct in the wild species of arthropod.

Centipedes

Possibly extinct species
Mecistocephalus cyclops
Mecistocephalus sechellarum

Seed shrimps

Extinct species
Liocypris grandis (listed as extinct however was rediscovered in 2003)
Namibcypris costata

Arachnids

Extinct species

Possibly extinct species

Millipedes

Extinct species

Possibly extinct species

Entognatha

Possibly extinct species
Ceratophysella sp. 'HC'
Delamarephorura tami

Maxillopoda

Extinct species
Afrocyclops pauliani
Tropodiaptomus ctenopus

Malacostracans

Extinct species

Possibly extinct species

Extinct in the wild species
Socorro isopod (Thermosphaeroma thermophilum)

Insects

Extinct species

Possibly extinct species

Extinct in the wild species
Oahu deceptor bush cricket (Leptogryllus deceptor)

See also 
 List of least concern arthropods
 List of near threatened arthropods
 List of vulnerable arthropods
 List of endangered arthropods
 List of critically endangered arthropods
 List of data deficient arthropods

References 

Arthropods
Recently extinct arthropods
Recently extinct arthropods